Towlash (also Romanized as Ţowlash and Ţūlāsh; also known as Tolasht and Tūlmān) is a village in Khanandabil-e Sharqi Rural District, in the Central District of Khalkhal County, Ardabil Province, Iran. At the 2006 census, its population was 1,372, in 306 families.

References 

Towns and villages in Khalkhal County